Painter of Dead Girls is a compilation album by the grindcore band Pig Destroyer. It features songs from their Gnob and Benümb splits as well as a cover of the Helmet song "In the Meantime". J. R. Hayes once said that he did not remember the lyrics to the first seven tracks, and that he could not decipher them. Said lyrics have now been found and are available online.  The cover art was done by Chris Taylor of Pg. 99.

The iTunes version of Painter excludes the three cover songs.

Track listing 
All lyrics written by J. R. Hayes. All music written by Scott Hull, except where noted.
"Hymn" – 1:37
"Taskmaster" – 0:45
"Black Centipede" – 0:30
"Immune to Life" – 0:28
"Fuck You Up and Get High" (Dwarves cover) – 0:33
"Contagion" – 0:16
"Blank Dice" – 0:27
"Blonde Prostitute" – 0:55
"Patterns of Failure" – 1:25
"Rejection Fetish" – 1:38
"Dark Satellites" – 0:51
"Purity Undone" – 0:34
"Forgotten Child" – 1:31
"White Sand" – 0:27
"Painter of Dead Girls" – 0:49
"Down in the Streets" (The Stooges cover) – 3:45
"In the Meantime" (Helmet cover) – 3:01

Personnel
J. R. Hayes – vocals
Scott Hull – guitar
Brian Harvey – drums
Chris Taylor – artwork

References

2004 compilation albums
Pig Destroyer albums
Robotic Empire compilation albums